Nelly (Spanish Cerro Nelly) is a stratovolcano in the Andes located in the Cordillera Occidental of Bolivia, about 5,676 m (18,622 ft) high. It is situated within the Eduardo Avaroa Andean Fauna National Reserve, north east of the Licancabur volcano, Laguna Verde and Laguna Blanca and next to Mount Laguna Verde in the Potosí Department, Sur Lípez Province, San Pablo de Lípez Municipality, Quetena Grande Canton.

See also
List of mountains in the Andes
 Laguna Celeste
 Laguna Colorada
 Laguna Hedionda
 Uturunku

References 

Nelly
Five-thousanders of the Andes